Dam Eshkaft-e Muneh (also Romanized as Dam Eshkaft-e Mūneh; also known as Dameshgaft and Dam Eshkaft) is a village in Tayebi-ye Garmsiri-ye Shomali Rural District, in the Central District of Landeh County, Kohgiluyeh and Boyer-Ahmad Province, Iran. At the 2006 census, its population was 67, in 14 families.

References 

Populated places in Landeh County